Devlin J. Robinson is an American businessman and politician who is the Pennsylvania State Senator for the 37th district. A Republican, he was elected in the 2020 election, defeating Democratic incumbent Pam Iovino. Robinson assumed office on December 1, 2020.

References

External links

Senator Devlin J. Robinson (R) — official PA Senate site
Devlin Robinson for Senate — official campaign site

Living people
Republican Party Pennsylvania state senators
21st-century American politicians
Year of birth missing (living people)
Robert Morris University alumni
Joseph M. Katz Graduate School of Business alumni